Consort Fu may refer to:

Consort Fu (Yuan) (died 2 BC), concubine of Emperor Yuan of Han
Empress Fu (Ai) (died 1 BC), wife of Emperor Ai of Han 
Fu Shou (died 214), wife of Emperor Xian of Han
Queen Fu ( 394), wife of Qifu Gangui (ruler of Western Qin)
Fu sisters (Fu Mo's daughters)
Fu Song'e (died 404), concubine of Murong Xi (Emperor Zhaowen of Later Yan)
Fu Xunying (died 407), wife of Murong Xi 
Fu sisters (Fu Yanqing's daughters)
Empress Fu the Elder (931–956), second wife of Chai Rong (Emperor Shizong of Later Zhou)
Princess Fu (Song dynasty) (941–975), Emperor Taizong of Song's first wife, died before he took the throne
Empress Dowager Fu (Later Zhou) (died 993), third wife of Chai Rong